The various lists of radio stations in Canada are organized in a number of ways.

Stations by province or territory
 List of radio stations in Alberta
 List of radio stations in British Columbia
 List of radio stations in Manitoba
 List of radio stations in New Brunswick
 List of radio stations in Newfoundland and Labrador
 List of radio stations in the Northwest Territories
 List of radio stations in Nova Scotia
 List of radio stations in Nunavut
 List of radio stations in Ontario
 List of radio stations in Prince Edward Island
 List of radio stations in Quebec
 List of radio stations in Saskatchewan
 List of radio stations in Yukon

Stations by format

 List of Christian radio stations in Canada
 List of high school radio stations in Canada
 List of campus radio stations in Canada
 List of community radio stations in Canada

Stations by network

National

Networked programming 
 CBC Radio One
 CBC Music
 CBC Radio 3
 Ici Radio-Canada Première
 Ici Musique

Networked brands 

 Bounce Radio (Adult hits, Bell Media)
 Jewel (Soft AC, Evanov)
 Kiss Radio (CHR or hot AC, Rogers Media)
 Move Radio (Hot AC, Bell Media)
 Pure Country (Country, Bell Media)
 Virgin Radio (CHR, licensed by Bell Media)

Quebec
 CKOI
 Rouge FM
 Réseau des Appalaches
 Rythme FM
 Énergie

First Nations
 Native Communications (Manitoba)
 Missinipi Broadcasting Corporation (Saskatchewan)
 Aboriginal Voices (defunct)
 Wawatay Native Communications Society (Ontario)
 CFWE (Alberta)

Defunct
 CKO
 Corus Quebec
 Dominion Network
 Haliburton Broadcasting Group
 Larche Communications
 Mid-Canada Radio
 Pelmorex Radio Network
 Souvenirs Garantis
 The Team
 Trans-Canada Network

See also
List of defunct radio stations in Canada

Stations by ownership group
 Acadia Broadcasting
 Astral Media
 Bell Media Radio
 Blackburn Radio
 CHIN Radio/TV International
 Clear Sky Radio
 Corus Entertainment
 Evanov Communications
 Fairchild Radio
 Golden West Broadcasting
 Le5 Communications
 Jim Pattison Group
 Maritime Broadcasting System
 My Broadcasting Corporation
 Newcap Broadcasting
 RNC Media
 Rogers Communications
 Slaight Communications
 Vista Broadcast Group

Defunct
 Maclean-Hunter
 Selkirk Communications
 Telemedia
 Western International Communications

Satellite radio
 Sirius XM Canada

References

External links

CRTC - Canadian Radio-television and Telecommunications Commission
www.ic.gc.ca - Industry Canada
History of Canadian radio stations - Canadian Communications Foundation
www.canadianradiodirectory.com - Canadian Radio Directory
Meaning of call letters - American Radio History

 Canada